Cable is an unincorporated, census-designated place located in the town of Cable, Bayfield County, Wisconsin, United States.

Cable has a post office with ZIP code 54821. As of the 2010 census, its population was 206.

History
Cable was laid out in 1878. It was named for R. Cable, a local hotel owner. A post office called Cable has been in operation since 1882.

References

Census-designated places in Bayfield County, Wisconsin
Census-designated places in Wisconsin